The Ardashen Church or simply as Jibistasi is a Georgian Orthodox Church located in Ardeşen, Rize Province, northeastern Turkey, on the border with Georgia. The date of the church building can be traced to Middle Ages that are adjacent to the so-called late-Byzantine period. The architectural canon of the church is very well studied and it belongs to the eastern school of the mid and late Byzantine periods. According to the planning scheme, similar buildings are numerously found along the whole northern Black Sea littoral.

References 

Georgian churches in Turkey